Kari-Pekka Toivonen (born 6 May 1967) is a Finnish actor. He received a 2004 Best Actor Jussi Award for the film Upswing. Taivonen, who received his Master's Degree at the Helsinki Theatre Academy, was the recipient of a 2005 Shooting Stars Award.

Filmography
 The Path of the Righteous Men (2012)
 The Storage (2011)
 Kolmistaan (2008, in coming) – Tomi Laakso
 Sooloilua (2007, in coming)
 V2 – jäätynyt enkeli (2007) – Taisto Pusenius
 Rock'n Roll Never Dies (2006) – Pumppu
 Suden arvoitus (2006)
 Äideistä parhain (2005) – Lauri, Eero's father
 Kukkia ja sidontaa (2004) – Ali Makkonen
 Lapsia ja aikuisia – kuinka niitä tehdään? (2004) – Antero
 Nousukausi (2003) – Kari
 Lakeuden kutsu (2000) – Nikander's helper
 Rukajärven tie (1999) – Leinonen
 Vääpeli Körmy ja kahtesti laukeava (1997) – corporal Törönen
 Sagojogan ministeri (1997) – Otto Swinskjöld
 Peppi Pitkätossu (1997)
 Tie naisen sydämeen (1996) – Kihara
 Romanovin kivet (1993) – Valto
 Ristilukki (1993) – Kuusinen

References

External links
 

1967 births
Living people
Actors from Turku
Finnish male actors